The Ministry of Agriculture Jihad ( Vezārat-e Jahād-e Keshāvarzī) is an Iranian government body established in 2001 responsible for the oversight of Agriculture in Iran. The ministry has been called Jihad of Construction but it was merged with agriculture ministry in 2001 to form the Ministry of Agricultural Jihad.

Agricultural Research, Education and Extension Organization
Agricultural Research, Education and Extension Organization (AREEO) was established by the Act of Islamic Consultative Assembly on June 30, 1974. The main mandate of the Agricultural Research, Education and Extension Organization is to develop and manage all research activities of agriculture and natural resources in the Ministry of Agriculture-Jihad. Agricultural Research, Education and Extension Organization is determined to facilitate an effective collaboration between Iranian and International Research Institutes on agriculture and well recognized research programs in the field. Some institutes under the umbrella of Agricultural Research, Education and Extension Organization had been established several years before establishment of Agricultural Research, Education and Extension Organization, such as: Iranian Fisheries Science Research Institute in 1918, Iranian Research Institute of Plant Protection in 1923, Razi Vaccine and Serum Research Institute in 1925, and Seed and Plant Improvement Institute in 1930.
Currently, Agricultural Research, Education and Extension Organization with 19 nationwide research institutes including multidisciplinary and crop based research centers, 34 provincial research and education centers; 360 research stations, farms and bases; 34 agricultural extension directorates; 1213 district extension centers; 23 research incubation centers and 142 knowledge-based enterprises is considered as the largest national agricultural research system (NARS) in the middle east. Over 10,000 employees including nearly 3000 scientists are working at research and education institutions of Agricultural Research, Education and Extension Organization in various provinces and regions of Islamic Republic of Iran. The mandates of research Institutes of Agricultural Research, Education and Extension Organization of Islamic Republic of Iran are categorized in three main areas, including agricultural and horticultural plants, animal research and finally, Natural Resources and Agricultural Engineering Research. According to these main areas of research, the research institutes of Agricultural Research, Education and Extension Organization of Islamic Republic of Iran can be clustered as:

Agricultural and Horticultural Plants Research Institutes
Horticultural Sciences Research Institute (HSRI)    
Iranian Research Institute of Plant Protection (IRIPP)
Seed and Plant Improvement Institute (SPII)
Dryland Agricultural Research Institute (DARI)
Sugar Beet Seed Institute (SBSI)
Rice Research Institute of Iran (RRII)
Cotton Research Institute of Iran (CRII)
Agricultural Biotechnology Research Institute of Iran (ABRII)
Seed and Plant Certification and Registration Institute (SPCRI)
Animal Research Institutes
Iranian Fisheries Science Research Institute (IFSRI)
Razi Vaccine and Serum Research Institute (RVSRI)
Animal Science Research Institute of Iran (ASRII)
Iran Silk Research Center (ISRC)
International Sturgeon Research Institute (ISRI)
Natural Resources and Agricultural Engineering Research Institutes
Research Institute of Forests and Rangelands (RIFR)
Soil Conservation and Watershed Management Research Institute (SCWMRI)
Soil and Water Research Institute (SWRI)
Agricultural Engineering Research Institute (AERI)
National Salinity Research Center (NSRC)
National Center for Genetic Resources (NCGR)

See also
Agriculture in Iran
Agricultural Research, Education and Extension Organization
Iranian Agriculture News Agency
Water supply and sanitation in Iran
Iran Combine Manufacturing Company

References

External links
 Webpage of the Ministry of Jihad-e-Agriculture

Agriculture
Iran
Iran, Agriculture
2001 establishments in Iran
Agricultural organisations based in Iran